MonkeySports is a retailer in the sporting goods industry, focused on selling ice hockey, lacrosse, and baseball/softball equipment. It is a private company originating in 1999, with John Naaman as the founder and CEO and Tom Arnold as the CFO. Its first store was initially operated as a small hockey store and consisted of only three employees. As of 2023, MonkeySports owns and operates ten retail stores in Texas, New York, New Jersey, Massachusetts, Colorado, New Hampshire, California, Sweden, and Canada. 
The company also runs six online store websites. In 2013, MonkeySports was ranked in Internet Retailer's "Top 500 U.S. E-Retailers" at number 241. 

From 1999 to 2014, MonkeySports was headquartered in Corona, California. Seeking a favorable business climate, they relocated their headquarters and distribution center to Allen, Texas and opened a large superstore in April 2017.

References

Sporting goods retailers of the United States
Online retailers of the United States
Retail companies established in 1999
Sporting goods brands
Companies based in Allen, Texas
1999 establishments in Texas